Ministry of Defence (MoD) of the government of Ghana, is the governmental department responsible for defending the Republic of Ghana from internal and external military threats and promotion of Ghanaian national defence interests. The MoD political head is the Defence Minister of Ghana, and its offices are located in Accra, Greater Accra.

See also
 Ghana Armed Forces
 Minister for Defence (Ghana)

References

External links
 Ghana Armed Forces (GAF) 

Defence
Ghana